Claudia Paola Suárez Fernández (born May 16, 1987) is a Venezuelan model and former beauty pageant winner.

Suárez, who stands 5'10.5" (1,79 m) tall, represented the state of Mérida in the national beauty pageant Miss Venezuela 2006, on September 14, 2006, and obtained the title of Miss Venezuela Mundo 2007, after placing second to Ly Jonaitis of the state of Guárico.  On December 1, 2007, she represented her country in the Miss World 2007 pageant in Sanya (China), placing among the top 16 semifinalists.  On January 26, 2008, she placed 2nd runner-up at the Miss Atlantico Internacional 2008 pageant in Punta del Este, Uruguay.

See also
 Ly Jonaitis
 Vanessa Peretti

References

External links
Miss Venezuela Official Page
Miss World Official Page

1987 births
Living people
Miss Venezuela World winners
Miss World 2007 delegates
People from Mérida, Mérida
Venezuelan female models
Venezuelan people of Spanish descent